Colombia is a unitary republic made up of thirty-two departments (Spanish: departamentos, sing. departamento) and a Capital District (Distrito Capital). Each department has a governor (gobernador) and an Assembly (Asamblea Departamental), elected by popular vote for a four-year period. The governor cannot be re-elected in consecutive periods. Departments are country subdivisions and are granted a certain degree of autonomy.

Departments are formed by a grouping of municipalities (municipios, sing. municipio). Municipal government is headed by mayor (alcalde) and administered by a municipal council (concejo municipal), both of which are elected for four-year periods.

Some departments have subdivisions above the level of municipalities, commonly known as provinces.

Chart of departments 
Each one of the departments of Colombia in the map below links to a corresponding article. Current governors serving four-year terms from 2015 to 2019 are also shown, along with their respective political party or coalition.

Indigenous territories 

The indigenous territories are at the third level of administrative division in Colombia, as are the municipalities. Indigenous territories are created by agreement between the government and indigenous communities. In cases where indigenous territories cover more than one department or municipality, local governments jointly administer them with the indigenous councils, as set out in Articles 329 and 330 of the Colombian Constitution of 1991. Also indigenous territories may achieve local autonomy if they meet the requirements of the law.

Article 329 of the 1991 constitution recognizes the collective indigenous ownership of indigenous territories and repeats that are inalienable. Law 160 of 1994 created the National System of Agrarian Reform and Rural Development Campesino, and replaced Law 135 of 1961 on Agrarian Social Reform; it establishes and sets out the functions of INCORA, one of the most important being to declare which territories will acquire the status of indigenous protection and what extension of existing ones will be allowed. Decree 2164 of 1995 interprets Law 160 of 1994, providing, among other things, a legal definition of indigenous territories.

Indigenous territories in Colombia are mostly in the departments of Amazonas, Cauca, La Guajira, Guaviare, and Vaupés.

History

The Republic of Gran Colombia

When it was first established in 1819, The Republic of Gran Colombia had three departments. Venezuela, Cundinamarca (now Colombia) and Quito (now Ecuador). In 1824, the Distrito del Centro (which became Colombia) was divided into five departments and further divided into seventeen provinces. One department, Istmo Department, consisting of two provinces, later became Panama.

Republic of New Granada

With the dissolution of Gran Colombia in 1826 by the Revolution of the Morrocoyes (La Cosiata), New Granada kept its 17 provinces. In 1832 the provinces of Vélez and Barbacoas were created, and in 1835 those of Buenaventura and Pasto were added. In 1843 those of Cauca, Mompós and Túquerres were created. At this time the cantons (cantones) and parish districts were created, which provided the basis for the present-day municipalities.

By 1853 the number of provinces had increased to thirty-six, namely:Antioquia, Azuero, Barbacoas, Bogotá, Buenaventura, Cartagena, Casanare, Cauca, Chiriquí, Chocó, Córdova, Cundinamarca, García Rovira, Mariquita, Medellín, Mompós, Neiva, Ocaña, Pamplona, Panamá, Pasto, Popayán, Riohacha, Sabanilla, Santa Marta, Santander, Socorro, Soto, Tequendama, Tunja, Tundama, Túquerres, Valle de Upar, Veraguas, Vélez and Zipaquirá. However, the new constitution of 1853 introduced federalism, which lead to the consolidation of provinces into states. By 1858 this process was complete, with a resulting eight federal states: Panamá was formed in 1855, Antioquia in 1856, Santander in May 1857, and Bolívar, Boyacá, Cauca, Cundinamarca and Magdalena were formed in June 1858. 1861 saw the creation of the final federal state of Tolima.

Republic of Colombia
The Colombian Constitution of 1886 converted the states of Colombia into departments, with the state presidents renamed as governors. The states formed the following original departments:

 Antioquia Department
 Bolívar Department
 Boyacá Department
 Cauca Department
 Cundinamarca Department
 Magdalena Department
 Panamá Department
 Santander Department
 Tolima Department

Maps gallery

See also

 ISO 3166-2:CO
 List of Colombian flags
 List of political and geographic subdivisions by total area
 States of Colombia
 List of Colombian departments by Human Development Index

References

External links
  List of Colombian department governors
 

 
Subdivisions of Colombia
Colombia, Departments
Departments, Colombia
Colombia geography-related lists